Bogarde is a surname. Notable people with the surname include:

Sir Dirk Bogarde (1921–1999), English actor and novelist
Lamare Bogarde (born 2004), Dutch professional footballer for Aston Villa
Melayro Bogarde (born 2002), Dutch professional footballer for Hoffenheim
Winston Bogarde (born 1970), Dutch former professional footballer